= Qasimwala railway station =

Railway station in Pakistan

Coordinates: 30.153289°N 73.829037°E

General information
- Owner: Ministry of Railways

Other information
- Station code: QSM

History
- Former names: Great Indian Peninsula Railway
Location

Qasimwala railway station (Urdu: قاسم والا ریلوے اسٹیشن) is located in Pakistan.

== See also ==
- List of railway stations in Pakistan
- Pakistan Railways
